P protein, also known as melanocyte-specific transporter protein or pink-eyed dilution protein homolog, is a protein that in humans is encoded by the oculocutaneous albinism II (OCA2) gene. The P protein is believed to be an integral membrane protein involved in small molecule transport, specifically of tyrosine - a precursor of melanin. Certain mutations in OCA2 result in type 2 oculocutaneous albinism.  OCA2 encodes the human homologue of the mouse p (pink-eyed dilution) gene.

The human OCA2 gene is located on the long arm (q) of chromosome 15, specifically from base pair 28,000,020 to base pair 28,344,457 on chromosome 15.

Function 
OCA2 provides instructions for making the protein called P protein which is located in melanocytes which are specialized cells that produce melanin, and in the cells of the retinal pigment epithelium. Melanin is responsible for giving color to the skin, hair, and eyes. Moreover, melanin is found in the light-sensitive tissue of the retina of the eye which plays a role in normal vision.

The exact function of protein P is unknown, but it has been found that it is essential for the normal coloring of skin, eyes, and hair; and likely involved in melanin production. This gene seems to be the main determinant of eye color depending on the amount of melanin production in the iris stroma (large amounts giving rise to brown eyes; little to no melanin giving rise to blue eyes).

This gene is mutated in Astyanax mexicanus, a Mexican fish which is characterized by a chronic Albinism in cave's individuals. It exists as a deletion in Pachón and Molino's caves fish that produces the albinism.

Clinical significance 
Mutations in the OCA2 gene cause a disruption in the normal production of melanin; therefore, causing vision problems and reductions in hair, skin, and eye color. Oculocutaneous albinism caused by mutations in the OCA2 gene is called oculocutaneous albinism type 2. The prevalence of OCA type 2 is estimated at 1/38,000-1/40,000 in most populations throughout the world, with a higher prevalence in the African population of 1/3,900-1/1,500. Other diseases associated with the deletion of the OCA2 gene are Angelman syndrome (light-colored hair and fair skin) and Prader-Willi syndrome (unusually light-colored hair and fair skin). With both these syndromes, the deletion often occurs in individuals with either syndrome.

A mutation in the HERC2 gene adjacent to OCA2, affecting OCA2's expression in the human iris, is found common to nearly all people with blue eyes. It has been hypothesized that all blue-eyed humans share a single common ancestor with whom the mutation originated.

The His615Arg allele of OCA2 is involved in the light skin tone and the derived allele is restricted to East Asia with high frequencies, with highest frequencies in Eastern East Asia (49-63%), midrange frequencies in Southeast Asia, and the lowest frequencies in Western China and some Eastern European populations.

References

Further reading

External links 

  GeneReviews/NCBI/NIH/UW entry on Oculocutaneous Albinism Type 2

Genes on human chromosome 15
Eye color